Terraform (2006) is the collaborative album by ambient musicians Steve Roach and Loren Nerell, who became friends since 1982 in Los Angeles. After years, they decided to create an organic, surreal and ambient soundscape environments. Mixed and structured at the Timeroom. Originally released on Soleilmoon Recordings in 2006 as a limited edition DVD-sized Digipak with 3 postcards. It was later released in 2009 on Projekt in a traditional jewel case.

Track listing

Personnel 
Adapted from Discogs
 Brian Parnham – photography
 Steve Roach – producer
 Loren Nerell, Steve Roach – creating

References

External links 
 Terraform at Bandcamp
 Terraform at Discogs

2006 albums
Steve Roach (musician) albums
Projekt Records albums
Collaborative albums